Scinax blairi is a species of frog in the family Hylidae.

Habitat and ecology
It is endemic to Colombia.
Its natural habitats are moist savanna, freshwater marshes, pastureland, plantations, rural gardens, ponds, irrigated land, seasonally flooded agricultural land and canals and ditches.

References

blairi
Amphibians of Colombia
Amphibians described in 1972
Taxonomy articles created by Polbot